Joseph C. Hickerson (born October 20, 1935, in Highland Park, Illinois) is a folk singer and songleader. A graduate of Oberlin College, for 35 years (1963–1998) he was Librarian and Director of the Archive of Folk Song at the American Folklife Center of the Library of Congress. Joe brought together the Ukrainian source and his own verses to create the basis for "Where Have All the Flowers Gone?" in collaboration with Pete Seeger. He participated in the first LP recording of "Kumbayah". Along with Dave Guard, he is credited with the creation of the Kingston Trio's version of "Bonny Hielan Laddie". He is a lecturer, researcher, and performer, especially in New York State, Michigan, and the Chicago area.  he is living in Portland, Oregon.

Discography
We've Got Some Singing To Do (1958) The Folksmiths, featuring Joe Hickerson Folkways Records F-2407
Joe Hickerson With a Gathering of Friends (1970) Folk-Legacy Records
Drive Dull Care Away Volumes 1 & 2 (1976) Folk-Legacy Records

Filmography
The Wobblies 1979 (song performer)

References

Bibliography
 Ray M. Lawless (1965) Folksingers and Folksongs in America, p. 112-3, .
 Kristin Baggelaar and Donald Milton (1976) Folk Music: More Than A Song, p. 175-6, .
 Dave Marsh and John Swenson (1979) The Rolling Stone Record Guide, 1st ed., p. 171, .

External links
Joe Hickerson's website (archived 2011-08-03)
Joe Hickerson interview on the down home radio show

1935 births
American folk musicians
American librarians
Living people
Oberlin College alumni
Indiana University alumni
American folk-song collectors
American folklorists
People from Lake Forest, Illinois